Seboacanthomas are a cutaneous condition, and a specific type of sebaceous adenoma which may be specific to Muir–Torre syndrome.

See also 
 Sebaceous nevus syndrome
 List of cutaneous conditions

References 

Epidermal nevi, neoplasms, and cysts